The AFF Futsal Championship or ASEAN Futsal Championship is an international futsal competition of the Southeast Asian nations and is sanctioned by the ASEAN Football Federation (AFF). It was first held in 2001 which took place every two years only until 2005, when it became an annual competition. Thailand have won every edition of the competition, except in 2010 where they did not participate.

Since 2013, the competitions in odd years have been served as qualifications of AFC Futsal Asian Cup.

Results 
{| border="1" style="border-collapse:collapse; text-align:center; font-size:90%;"width=100%
|- style="background:#C1D8FF;"
!rowspan=2 width=5%|Year
!rowspan=2 width=10%|Host
!width=1% rowspan=22 style="background:#ffffff;"|
!colspan=3|Final
!width=1% rowspan=10 style="background:#ffffff;"|
!colspan=3|Third-place match
|- style="background:#EFEFEF;"
!width=15% style="background:gold;"|Champion
!width=10% style="background:#ffffff;"|Score
!width=15% style="background:silver;"|Second Place
!width=15% style="background:#cc9966;"|Third Place
!width=10% style="background:#ffffff;"|Score
!width=15% style="background:#9acdff;"|Fourth Place
|-
|2001Details
|Malaysia
|
|12–1
|
|
|No playoffs
|
|- bgcolor=#D0E7FF
|2003Details
|Malaysia
|
|4–0
|
|
|5–3
|
|-
|2005Details
|Thailand
|
|5–1
|
|
|7–1
|
|- bgcolor=#D0E7FF
|2006Details
|Thailand
|
|10–3
|
|
|10–2
|
|-
|2007Details
|Thailand
|
|7–1
|
|
|6−6(3–1 pens.)
|
|- bgcolor=#D0E7FF
|2008Details
|Thailand
|
|5–1
|
|
|8–2
|
|-
|2009Details
|Vietnam
|
|4–1
|
|
|4–3
|
|- bgcolor=#D0E7FF
|2010Details
|Vietnam
|
|5–0
|
|
|No playoffs
|
|-
|2011
|Indonesia
|colspan=7|Cancelled
|-
|2012Details
|Thailand
|
|9–4
|
!rowspan=8|
|
|4–2
|
|-
|2013Details
|Thailand
|
|2–1
|
|
|7–3 
|
|- bgcolor=#D0E7FF
|2014Details
|Malaysia
|
|6–0
|
|
|2–2(5–3 pens.)
|
|-
|2015Details
|Thailand
|
|5–3
|
|
|6–5
|
|- bgcolor=#D0E7FF
|2016*Details
|Thailand
|
|8−1
|
|
|8−1
|
|-
|2017Details
|Vietnam
|
|4−3(a.e.t)
|
|
|2–2(4–3 pens.)
|
|- bgcolor=#D0E7FF
|2018Details
|Indonesia
|
|4−2
|
|
|3−1
|
|-
|2019Details
|Vietnam
|
|5–0
|
|
|7−3
|
|-
|2020
|Thailand
|colspan=7|Cancelled due to COVID-19 pandemic
|-
|2021|Thailand
| colspan="7" |Cancelled after Thailand was banned from hosting tournaments by WADA|-
|2022Details| Thailand
|
|2–2(5–3 pens.)
|
!rowspan=1|
|
|1–1(4–1 pens.)
|
|-
|}
(*) To be held in early 2017

 Performance by nations * = hosts Medals (2001-2022) 
 

 Summary (2001-2022) 

 Participating nations 
Legend
1st – Champions
2nd – Runners-up
3rd – Third place
4th – Fourth place
– = Did not participate
GS = Group stage
N/A = Not an AFF member
     – Hosts* Australia participated in 2007 as a guest.''

Final ranking

2001

2003

Awards

Winning coaches

FIFA Futsal World Cup qualifiers
Legend

1st – Champions
2nd – Runners-up
3rd – Third place
4th – Fourth place
QF – Quarterfinals
R2 – Round 2 (1989–2008, second group stage, top 8; 2012–present: knockout round of 16)
R1 – Round 1

 — Qualified but withdrew
 — Did not qualify
 — Did not enter
     – Hosts
(Australia join to qualified by Oceania Zone)
Q – Qualified for upcoming tournament

References 

 
International futsal competitions
AFF competitions
Futsal competitions in Asia
Recurring sporting events established in 2001
2001 establishments in Southeast Asia
Annual sporting events